Syed Anwarul Haq Haqqi (also known as S. A. H. Haqqi; 22 January 1922 – 10 February 2010) was an Indian scholar who headed the Political Science department of Aligarh Muslim University for twenty years. He was the younger brother of Abrarul Haq Haqqi.

Biography
Syed Anwarul Haq Haqqi was born on 22 January 1922 in Hardoi. He received a B.A. degree from University of Lucknow and a M.A in History from Aligarh Muslim University. He wrote his doctoral thesis on Timur under the supervision of Mohammad Habib. He wrote a second doctoral thesis on "The British Colonial Policy" at the London School of Economics.

Haqqi was head of the Aligarh Muslim University's Political Science department for twenty years. In 1967, he started the departmental journal, Indian Journal of Politics. He retired in 1982. Later he taught at University of Warsaw, Middle East Technical University and the University of Kashmir as a visiting professor.

Haqqi's elder brother Abrarul Haq Haqqi was an Islamic scholar who established the Ashraful Madaris in Hardoi. 

Haqqi died on 10 February 2010.

Literary works
Haqqi's works include: 
 Chingiz Khan: The life and Legacy of an Empire Builder
 Indian democracy at the crossroads
 The Union-State relations in India
 Secularism under siege : the Ayodhya tragedy in retrospect and prospect
 Democracy, Pluralism and Nation-Building
 The Turkish Impact on India the First Phase 
 The Atatürk Revolution and India 
 The Faith Movement of Mawlānā Muḥammad Ilyās
 The colonial policy of the Labour Government
 Problems of representation in the new states
 Machiavelli and Machiavellism (Urdu)

References

University of Lucknow alumni
Aligarh Muslim University alumni
Alumni of the London School of Economics
Academic staff of Aligarh Muslim University
People from Hardoi district